Superstar K is a South Korean television show on Mnet. Superstar K1 is season one of the Superstar competition series in which singers audition to get on the show. Each week, the singers perform a song and are eliminated based on the three judges' perception and audience voting.

This program began on July 24, 2009 and ended October 9, 2009 with the announcement of Seo In-guk as the winner and Jo Moon-geun as the runner-up.

Top 10

External links
 Official website

2009 South Korean television seasons